Get Crazy is a 1983 American musical comedy film directed by Allan Arkush, and stars Malcolm McDowell, Allen Garfield, Daniel Stern, Gail Edwards, and Ed Begley Jr.

Plot
It is December 31, 1982, and the Saturn Theater is preparing for its big New Year's Eve concert under the direction of owner and master showman Max Wolfe (Allen Garfield, credited as Allen Goorwitz), who has operated the Saturn since 1968. Assisting Max are stage manager Neil Allen (Daniel Stern), and visiting former stage manager Willy Loman (Gail Edwards). Also caught up in the wild activity is beleaguered stagehand Joey (Dan Frischman), temperamental lighting director Violetta (Mary Woronov), and Neil's younger sister Susie (Stacey Nelkin).

Max Wolfe holds a 30-year lease to the theater, but reptilian concert promoter Colin Beverly (Ed Begley Jr.) has other ideas. Beverly offers to buy Max out of his lease with what seems to be a generous deal at Beverly's concert auditorium and stadium, but Max refuses, ultimately becoming so incensed that he collapses of an apparent heart attack. Outside, Max's ingratiating nephew Sammy (Miles Chapin) informs Beverly that he stands to inherit the theater from his uncle, and Beverly offers Sammy the same deal he offered Max—if Sammy can get Max's signature on an agreement to transfer the Saturn's lease before midnight.

The various performers for the show are introduced:
Captain Cloud (the Turtles' Howard Kaylan) and the Rainbow Telegraph—Max Wolfe's favorite band and a spoof of Strawberry Alarm Clock—arriving in an aging bus that is painted à la the Merry Pranksters' Furthur. 
Nada (Lori Eastside from Kid Creole and the Coconuts) and her 15-member band (a spoof of such girl groups as the Bangles and the Go-Gos) playing an amalgam of many disparate styles of music that appeared on MTV in the early 1980s—part bubble-gum pop, part New Wave, part garage rock. They are joined by "Special Guest Star" Piggy (Lee Ving of the L.A. punk band Fear).
King Blues, the King of the Blues (Bill Henderson), a spoof of Muddy Waters (and, to a lesser extent, Bo Diddley and B. B. King).
Auden (Lou Reed), "metaphysical folk singer, inventor of the '70s, [and] antisocial recluse", a spoof of Bob Dylan. Auden, who initially complains of writer's block, is coaxed to appear thinking Max is close to death, but after blithely asking a taxi driver to take the "scenic route," he spends the majority of the movie on his cab ride, improvising lyrics for the song he intends to perform.
Reggie Wanker (Malcolm McDowell), "20 years of rock and roll and still on top", a spoof of Mick Jagger; featuring his drummer Toad played by John Densmore of The Doors. Wanker is beset by a general malaise, unable to fully enjoy his lavish situation of easily available women and drugs.

King Blues opens the show, performing two of his "own" hit songs, "The Blues Had a Baby and They Named it Rock and Roll" (by Muddy Waters) and "Hoochie Coochie Man" (by Willie Dixon). Next the Nada Band take the stage and perform "I'm Not Going to Take It No More." Piggy leads the band in a viciously punk-rock version of "Hoochie Coochie Man," complete with stage dives and slam dancing. Reggie sings a celebration of egotism, "Hot Shot," then moves on to his own version of "Hoochie Coochie Man".

As the show proceeds, Sammy tries to find ways to sabotage the theater, including fueling a fire in the basement and cutting the fire hose. Colin Beverly's henchmen, Mark and Marv (former teen heartthrobs Bobby Sherman and Fabian), give Sammy a bomb, which he plants in the rocket ship that Max will ride during the final countdown to midnight.

Willy overhears Mark and Marv talking about the bomb, and is captured by them and locked in the trunk of Colin Beverly's limousine. She escapes when the limo collides with Auden's taxicab, and runs back toward the theater. Only moments before midnight, Willy reaches the theater and tells Neil about the bomb. As the seconds tick away, the bomb is thrown from person to person out of the building, landing in Colin Beverly's limo just as it pulls up to the curb. The last second ticks away, the bomb explodes, everyone shouts "Happy New Year", and Captain Cloud leads the crowd in "Auld Lang Syne".

Quickly after, the crowd and bands exit the theater, just as Auden finally walks in. Max gives Neil the lease to the theater, saying he intends to retire. Neil offers partnership to Willy. The end credits roll while Auden sings "Little Sister" to the sole remaining patron, Susie. The dedication at the end of the film reads, "Thanks for the memories to the entire staff of the Fillmore East 1968–71."

Cast

Production
Arkush later said that everything based in the film was "based on real stuff, and I wish I could remake it as a realistic movie. But the only way I could get it made at the time was to do the Airplane! version of it. My second film, Heartbeeps (1981), had been a complete failure, and I was desperate to do a movie about something I really knew and cared about." He claims that producer Herbert F. Solow "was pretty much of a jerk. Whatever I’d suggest, he’d counter with another suggestion. It was just the way he was: everything he heard, he said “no” to... but he would take the germ of what you said, and put his own spin on it." In particular, the director claims he wanted to cast Mariska Hargitay, Jerry Orbach and Tom Hanks in the parts ultimately played by Stacey Nelkin, Allen Garfield and Daniel Stern, respectively, but Solow refused.

Concert scenes, as well as exterior shots of the marquee, were filmed at the historic Wiltern Theatre in Los Angeles, California. The theatre had been poorly maintained for years prior to filming, and was about to undergo a major restoration to return it to its former glory. According to Malcolm McDowell, "We trashed it just before they restored it.  They knew we were going to do it, so they didn't mind."

All actors performed their own vocal tracks, although none (except Lou Reed) wrote their songs. Malcolm McDowell specifically requested that he be allowed to sing as a condition of his contract.

Director Allan Arkush appears during "Auld Lang Syne", throwing frisbees from the wings while wearing his Fillmore East usher's T-shirt.

A few actors featured in the 1982 film Eating Raoul also appear in Get Crazy, including Paul Bartel, Mary Woronov, Susan Saiger and Ed Begley, Jr. as well as the stunt crew consisting of Bruce Paul Barbour and Rick Seaman.

Reception
Get Crazy was released on August 6, 1983, to mixed reviews. One of the kinder reviewers was Janet Maslin of The New York Times who called it "hip" and "good-natured" and wrote, "[It] isn't for everyone, but those well-disposed toward rock will find it energetic and funny." Box office sales were tepid as well: its domestic gross totaled US$1,645,711, and its theatrical run was brief.

Arkush said that, "the scam they came up with to release it was to sell the shares in it to some Wall Street tax shelter group, and then put it out so it would lose money… just like The Producers (1968)! So nobody saw it—on purpose! It was so horrible to work so hard on something, and then see it just thrown away. The audiences that saw it didn’t get it. They didn’t understand how there could be a rock concert with all these different kinds of acts. My take on it? It’s a movie with three thousand punch lines, but only a thousand jokes. There’s too much zaniness, and not enough human comedy. It’s just too bizarre."

Although Get Crazy is far lesser known than director Arkush's earlier film Rock 'n' Roll High School, it is a small cult favorite among fans of rock and roll movies, with some critics considering it to be "one of that genre's best outings."

Distribution
Embassy Home Entertainment released the film on VHS in 1984. Director Allan Arkush had stated that a DVD release was unlikely, due to issues with the sound elements.

The Embassy Home Entertainment VHS release is a fullscreen transfer using the open matte technique. As a result, the video shows (nearly) the full width of the theatrical release but occasionally reveals overhead boom microphones and other items that would be hidden when projected to a standard 1.85:1 ratio.

Kino Lorber has released the film for the first time on Blu-ray and DVD in December 2021 under a new 2K restoration and a slew of bonus features.

Soundtrack
The soundtrack to the film was released exclusively on LP in 1983 on the Morocco imprint of Motown Records, catalog number 6065CL. "Get Crazy" and "Hot Shot" were released together as a single to promote the album.

 US vinyl-LP and cassette
 "Get Crazy" – Sparks - 3:35
 "You Can't Make Me" – Lori Eastside & Nada - 3:02
 "Chop Suey" – The Ramones - 3:55
 "It's Only a Movie" (a.k.a. "But, But") – Marshall Crenshaw - 2:40
 "Little Sister" – Lou Reed - 6:09
 "I'm Not Gonna Take It" – Lori Eastside & Nada - 3:21
 "Hot Shot" – Malcolm McDowell - 3:18
 "The Blues Had a Baby and They Named It Rock & Roll" – Bill Henderson - 3:24
 "Hoochie Coochie Man" – Fear - 2:34
 "Starscape" – Michael Boddicker - 1:36
 "Auld Lang Syne" – Howard Kaylan & Cast - 2:36

References

External links

1983 films
1980s musical comedy films
American independent films
American musical comedy films
American rock music films
1980s English-language films
Films directed by Allan Arkush
Films set in a theatre
Films set in Los Angeles
Films set around New Year
1983 comedy films
1980s American films